Michael Rösele (born 7 October 1974 in Augsburg) is a German former professional footballer who played as a midfielder. He played for seven seasons with 1. FC Köln, including five in the Bundesliga.

References

1974 births
Living people
Sportspeople from Augsburg
German footballers
Association football midfielders
FC Augsburg players
1. FC Köln players
1. FC Köln II players
Rot Weiss Ahlen players
Fortuna Düsseldorf players
Bundesliga players
2. Bundesliga players
Footballers from Bavaria